Artie Lange's Beer League (also known simply as Beer League) is a 2006 American comedy film written and produced by, and starring, Artie Lange. It was released in select theaters on September 15, 2006 in the New Jersey, New York, Cleveland, and Philadelphia areas.

As of 2022, Beer League remains Lange's only lead role in a film.

Plot
Artie DeVanzo (Artie Lange) is an unemployed town drunk who plays softball with his buddies Maz (Ralph Macchio) and Johnny (Jimmy Palumbo) for Ed's Bar and Swill. Their arch-rival is Manganelli Fitness, led by Dennis Manganelli (Anthony DeSando). After the teams brawl during the first game of the year, the town's police chief decides whichever team finishes best in the league that season can still play in the league, and whichever team loses is out for good.

Artie lives at home with his mother (Laurie Metcalf) and can never hold a job or a girlfriend for very long. After a night out with his pals, he ends up at a diner for late night food, where he sees old flame Linda Salvo (Cara Buono) out with her friends. Artie abandons his friends and starts some small talk with Linda, which results in a one-night stand. At first Linda is disgusted and annoyed that she let herself fall into another meaningless encounter, but Artie decides to actually try to attempt a more meaningful relationship with her.

The Ed's team, traditionally a league doormat, decides to actually practice in an attempt to beat out Manganelli and stay in the league. The regular season is highlighted by Maz's bachelor party and wedding, and Johnny's attempt to bat .700 for the year.

The team charges up the standings to qualify for the championship game against the four-time defending champions from Manganelli Fitness. However, 'Dirt', Ed's Bar and Swill's team pitcher, collapses and dies from a heart attack at practice in the days leading up to the championship. After the funeral, the rest of the team drinks heavily in homage to Dirt before they play in the championship game scheduled for that afternoon.

Manganelli's team quickly builds a 10–0 lead over their inebriated opponents, and that remains the score heading into the final inning of the game. After two outs, the season rests on Artie's shoulders.

Artie proceeds to launch a Manganelli pitch over the fence in left field for a solo home run, an incredibly rare feat that nobody in the league has done "since '89". That shot only makes the score 10–1, but Ed's Bar and Swill comes to life and bats around the lineup in the inning, bringing Artie back to the plate, now with the bases loaded and the score 10–6, though still with two outs.

Artie hits the ball to right field, where nobody is stationed because Manganelli has his fielders playing the "DeVanzo Shift"; completely dead-pull. All three baserunners come home, and as the ball is thrown away, Artie races home in an attempt to tie the score. He and Manganelli have a collision at the plate, but Manganelli hangs on to the ball for the final out and a 10–9 victory.

After the game ends, however, Artie keeps his vow of not letting Manganelli have the championship trophy, stealing it during the postgame awards ceremony and driving off down Route 3 past Giants Stadium, heading for the Jersey Shore with Linda, talking about other leagues in other towns and how he can still play in them.

Cast

Artie Lange as Artie DeVanzo
Ralph Macchio as Maz
Anthony DeSando as Dennis Manganelli
Cara Buono as Linda Salvo
Jimmy Palumbo as Johnny Trinno
Joe Lo Truglio as Dave
Jerry Minor as Tim
Seymour Cassel as Dirt
Michael Deeg as Alfonse
Maddie Corman as Marilyn
Matthew Gumley as Tommy
Jim Florentine as Crispino
Mary Birdsong as Rhonda
Laurie Metcalf as  Mrs. DeVanzo
Louis Lombardi as Police Chief Gugliamino
Jim Breuer as Football Guy
Todd Barry as Creepy Guy down by the shore
Tina Fey as Gym Secretary
Keisha as "The Pitching Machine"
Elizabeth Regen as Gina
Nick DiPaolo as Cousin Mickey

Reception
The film was a box office failure. Figures from Box Office Mojo show the film was only released in 164 theaters for 14 days, with an opening weekend gross of $302,908, and a total domestic gross of $472,185.

The film received mostly negative reviews. It holds a 27% "Rotten" rating at the review aggregator website Rotten Tomatoes, based on 15 reviews. Christopher Null of Filmcritic.com, called the film, "[A] whole lot of lewd potty humor that doesn't really add up to anything substantial, a guilty pleasure of sorts when taken in small bursts, but which grows somewhat tiresome in the long run". Critic Richard Roeper gave one of the four positive reviews, saying, "Beer League is raunchy and tacky, but it's a hell of a lot funnier than something like Failure To Launch". Another positive review was from Brian Orndorf of eFilmCritic.com: "Beer League is not for tender ears, but more for the beer-bellied, rascally rule breaker in all of us, and most importantly, there's a great chance something in here will make you laugh".

References

External links
 
 

2006 films
Softball mass media
2000s sports comedy films
American sports comedy films
American baseball films
Films shot in New Jersey
Films set in New Jersey
2006 comedy films
2000s English-language films
2000s American films